Proctocolectomy is the surgical removal of the rectum and all or part of the colon. It is the most widely accepted surgical method for ulcerative colitis and familial adenomatous polyposis (FAP).

A proctocolectomy is considered a cure for ulcerative colitis, as the disease only attacks the large intestine and the rectum, and the disease cannot flare-up again, but extra-intestinal symptoms will remain. It can also be performed for Crohn's disease that has damaged the entire large intestine and caused complications, but it does not cure or eliminate the disease.

See also 
 List of surgeries by type

References 

Digestive system surgery
Rectum